The 2017 Moscow Victory Day Parade was a military parade that took place in Red Square in Moscow on 9 May 2017 to commemorate the 72nd anniversary of the capitulation of Nazi Germany in 1945. The annual parade marks the Allied victory in World War II on the Eastern Front, on the same day as the signing of the German act of capitulation to the Allies in Berlin, at midnight of 9 May 1945 (Russian time). President of the Russian Federation Vladimir Putin delivered his fourteenth holiday address to the nation after the parade inspection presided over by Minister of Defense General of the Army Sergey Shoygu.

For the Military Band Service of the Armed Forces of Russia, the 2017 parade was the first for its current Senior Director of Music, Colonel Timofey Mayakin, who was appointed in this capacity last August 2016, succeeding the now deceased Lieutenant General Valery Khalilov, the former Senior Director of Music and conductor of the Moscow area massed bands for the holiday parades for a record 14 years, who was in the 2016 Russian Defence Ministry Tupolev Tu-154 crash.

President of Moldova Igor Dodon was present at the parade after confirming that he would be present at the parade in a meeting with Putin.

The 2017 Moscow parade was the first and only parade so far in modern times to have its flypast segment cancelled due to bad weather for the first time since the flypasts resumed in 2008. General of the Army Shoygu, Colonel General Salyukov as well as parading officers from all service branches (land, sea and air) also wore new officer uniforms (the Ground and Aerospace Forces uniforms being a throwback to the M1943 dress uniforms). ODON National Guardsmen also wore new 4 button uniforms with a new shoulder board design.

Preparatory activities 

Beginning in November/December 2016, preparations for the parade were well attended at the unit level. Individual unit practices were held in the various military installations for all the participating units in the national and local parades. Unit practices within Moscow Oblast itself started in early March in the Alabino field before the full blown parade practice run-throughs for all the participating units will commence.

All parade practice run began on 5 April 2017 in the Alabino training range with the first practice run through for the ground column, kicking off the month long national preparations for the 72nd Victory Day, and will last even until the middle of April when the runs on Red Square for the national parade itself will start, ending with a final general combined practice run of the parade in early May in the morning. From the 1st week up to the 3rd week of April, the Alabino military training center serves as the parade training ground for the estimated 14,000 military personnel in attendance for the Moscow parade, plus more than 126 vehicles and 78 aircraft.

Arctic military equipment such as the Tor-M2DT missile are due to make their first national parade appearance on this very day. Joining the ground column for the first time will be cadets from the Defense Ministry's Young Army Cadet Program.

The flypast practice run began at the Kublinka air base on 10 April 2017 - the very day RT premiered its series of 360 degree videos for this year's national parade.

Timeline for preparatory activities in Moscow 
 5 April towards 9 April - beginning of parade practice runs in Alabino, Moscow Oblast
 2nd up to 3rd week of April - General practice run-through in the Alabino training field, including flypast
 4th week of April until 2 days before Victory Day - practice runs in Red Square right up to the general practice run
 25–30 April, 2–6 May - evening parade practice run-throughs
 4–5 May - Air flypast practice runs
 7 May - general practice run at 10am MST

Full order of the 2017 parade 

Bold indicates first appearance, italic indicates multiple appearances, Bold and italic indicate returning appearance, all indicated unless otherwise noted.

 General of the Army Sergey Shoigu, Minister of Defense of the Russian Federation (parade inspector)
 Colonel General Oleg Salyukov, Commander-in-Chief of the Russian Ground Forces (parade commander)

Military Bands 
 Massed Military Bands of the Armed Forces under the direction of the Senior Director of Music of the Military Bands Service of the Armed Forces of the Russian Federation, Colonel Timofey Mayakin
 Corps of Drums of the Moscow Military Music College

Ground Column 
 154th Preobrazhensky Independent Commandant's Regiment Colour Guard
 Honour Guard Company of the 1st Honor Guard Battalion, 154th PICR
 Suvorov Military School
 Nakhimov Naval School
 Moscow Young Army Patriotic Cadets Unit (on behalf of the Young Army Cadets National Movement)
 Moscow National Pensions School Cadet Corps 
 Combined Arms Academy of the Armed Forces of the Russian Federation
 Military University of the Ministry of Defence of the Russian Federation
 Military Academy of Material and Technical Security "General of the Army A. V. Khrulev" 
 Zhukovsky – Gagarin Air Force Academy
 Military Space Academy "Alexander Mozhaysky"
 Pacific Naval Military Institute "Admiral Stepan Makarov"
 336th Independent Guards Biaystok Marine Brigade of the Baltic Fleet
 61st Kirkinesskaya Red Banner Marine Brigade of the Northern Fleet'
 Peter the Great Military Academy of the Strategic Missile Forces 
 Military Space Academy "Alexander Mozhaysky"
 Ryazan Higher Airborne Command School "Gen. of the Army Vasily Margelov" 98th Guards Airborne Division
 Engineering Forces, Nuclear, Biological and Chemical Defence and Control Military Academy "Marshal of the Soviet Union Semyon Timoshenko"
 29th and 38th Independent Railway Brigades of the Russian Railway Troops
 ODON Ind. Motorized Division of the National Guard Forces Command, Federal National Guard Troops Service of the Russian Federation "Felix Dzerzhinsky"
 Civil Defense Academy of the Ministry of Emergency Situations
 Moscow Border Guards Institute of the Federal Security Service of the Russian Federation
 2nd Guards Tamanskaya Motor Rifle Division "Mikhail Kalinin"
 4th Guards Kantemirovskaya Tank Division "Yuri Andropov"
 27th Independent Guards Sevastopol Motor Rifle Brigade "60th Diamond Jubilee Anniversary of the formation of the USSR"
 Moscow Higher Military Command School "Supreme Soviet of Russia"

 Mobile Column 
 T-34/85 medium tank
 GAZ-2975 "Tigr" infantry mobility vehicle (45th Guards Independent Reconnaissance Brigade)
 Kornet D/EM mobile ATGM system on the GAZ Tigr chassis 
 Typhoon-K MRAP (Russian military police)
 Ural Typhoon MRAP (Russian military police)
 BTR-82AM APC
 BMP-3 (27th Independent Guards "Sevastopol" Motorized Rifle Brigade)
 BMP Kurganets-25 APV and IFV (27th Independent Guards "Sevastopol" Motorized Rifle Brigade)
 T-72B3M (T-72B4) modernized main battle tank (2nd Guards "Tamanskaya" Motorized Rifle Division)
 T-14 main battle tank (2nd Guards "Tamanskaya" Motorized Rifle Division)
 2S19 Msta-S tracked self-propelled howitzer (147th Guards "Simferopol" Self-Propelled Artillery Regiment)
 2S35 Koalitsiya-SV tracked self-propelled howitzer (147th Guards "Simferopol" Self-Propelled Artillery Regiment)
 9K720 Iskander mobile tactical ballistic missile system (112th Guards "Novorossiysk" MRL Brigade)
 Tor-M2U  SAM complex on tracked chassis (6th Independent Tank Brigade)
 Buk-M2 mobile tracked SAM system (6th Independent Tank Brigade)
 Tor-M2DT  and Pantsir-SA towed Arctic SAM system on tracked Vityaz''' chassis (80th Independent (Arctic) Motor Rifle Brigade)
 BMD-4M air-droppable IFV (106th Guards Tula Airborne Division)
 BTR-MDM "Rakushka" APC (106th Guards Tula Airborne Division)
 Pantsir-S1 mobile SAM system on wheeled chassis (93rd Guards Anti-Aircraft Rocket Regiment)
 S-400 mobile SAM system on self-propelled wheeled MAZ-7910 chassis (93rd Guards Anti-Aircraft Rocket Regiment)RS-24 Yars road-mobile ICBM system (54th Guards Rocket Division)
 BTR Bumerang APC Air Fly Past Column 

The Russian MoD canceled the flypast segment minutes before the parade began on account of the bad weather on that day, which made it difficult for the aircraft to proceed as scheduled from their air bases. If the weather had improved the flypast would have been composed of the following:
 
 1 Mil Mi-26 4 Mil Mi-8 4 Mil Mi-28 from the Berkuts 4 Kamov Ka-52 4 Mil Mi-35 1 Tupolev Tu-160 4 Tupolev Tu-22M3 1 Antonov An-124 3 Ilyushin Il-76 3 Tupolev Tu-95 
 1 Ilyushin Il-78 and 1 Tupolev Tu-160 4 Yakovlev Yak-130 4 Sukhoi Su-24M 4 Sukhoi Su-34 4 Mikoyan MiG-31 Sukhoi Su-27 and Mikoyan MiG-29 of the Russian Knights and Strizhi 9 Mikoyan MiG-29 6 Sukhoi Su-27''

Other parades 

As per tradition, 26 other Russian major cities (Sevastopol and Kerch in the disputed Crimea included) held their parades on that day (some of them now including flypasts), and joint civil-military parades were hosted by 50 other towns and cities nationwide. Parades were held in both the pro-Russian territories in eastern Ukraine (the Donetsk People's Republic and the Luhansk People's Republic, both featuring the former United Armed Forces of Novorossiya and the republican MVD and EMERCOM units) and celebrations were held in almost all the former republics of the Soviet Union (save for the Baltics).

See also 
 Moscow Victory Parade of 1945
 Victory Day (9 May)
 Victory in Europe Day

References 

Moscow Victory Day Parades
2017 in military history
Moscow Victory Day Parade
May 2017 events in Russia
Articles containing video clips